Palo Verde Intake is a locale in La Paz County, in the U.S. state of Arizona, stretching into Riverside County in the U.S. state of California. It is the intake for the Palo Verde Dam.

References

Landforms of La Paz County, Arizona